A list of photographic processing techniques.

Color

Agfacolor
Ap-41 process (pre-1978 Agfa color slides; 1978-1983 was a transition period when Agfa slowly changed their color slide films from AP-41 to E6)
Anthotype
Autochrome Lumière, 1903
Carbon print, 1862
Chromogenic positive (Ektachrome)
E-3 process
E-4 process
E-6 process
Chromogenic negative
C-41 process
RA-4 process
Dufaycolor
Dye destruction
Cibachrome
Ilfochrome
Dye-transfer process
Finlaycolor
Heliochrome
Kinemacolor
Kodachrome
K-12 process
K-14 process
Lippmann plate, 1891
One-light

Black and white (monochrome)

A

Abration tone
Acetate film
Albertype
Albumen print, 1850
Algraphy
Ambrotype
Amphitype
Amylotype
Anaglyph
Anthotype
Anthrakotype
Archertype
Argentotype
Argyrotype
Aristo paper
Aristotype
Aristo
Artotype
Atrephograph
Atrograph
Aurotype
Autotype (photographic process)

B
Barrieotype
Baryta coated paper
Bayard process
Bichromate process
Bichromated gelatin
Bichromated gum arabic
Bichromatic albumen
Bitumen of Judea, 1826
Breyertype
Bromide paper
bromoil process, 1907
Burneum

C
Caffenol
Calotype, 1841
Cameo
Carbon print, 1855
Carbro Print
Carbro
Casein pigment
Catalysotype
Catalisotype
Catatype
Cellulose diacetate negative
Cellulose nitrate negative
Cellulose triacetate negative
Ceroleine
Chalkotype
Charbon Velour
Chlorobromide paper
Chromatype
Chripotype
Chrysotype, 1842
Chrystollotype
Cliché verre
Collodion paper
Collodion process, 1851
Collotype, 1855
Contact print
Contact sheet
Contretype
Copper Photogravure
Crystoleum
Crystal photo 1850
Cyanotype, 1842

D

Daguerreotype, 1839
Dallastype
Diaphanotype
Diazotype
dr5 chrome B&W positive process
Dry collodion negative
Dry collodion process
Dry plate
Dye coupler process
Dye destruction process
Dye diffusion transfer process
Dye transfer print

E

Eburneum
Ectograph
Ectographe
Electrotype
Energiatype
Enamaline
Enamel photograph

F

Feertype
Ferroprussiate paper
Ferrotype
Fluorotype

G

Gaslight paper
Gaudinotype
Gelatino-Bromide emulsions, 1875
Gelatin-silver process
Gem tintype
Gum bichromate
Gum Bichromate Print
Gum Dichromate
Gum over platinum
Gum printing = *Photogravure

H

Hallotype
Heliography
Heliotype
Hellenotype
Hillotype
Hyalotype -1850
Hydrotype
 Hypersensitization
Highgrid 2014

I

Inkodye
Intermediate negative
Internegative
Iron salt process
Ivorytype -1855

J

K

Kallitype

L

Lambertype
Leggotype
LeGray
Levytype
Linograph
Linotype

M

Mariotype
Meisenbach process
Melainotype
Melanograph
Metotype
Mordançage

N

O

Oil Print Process
Opalotype
Ozobrom process
Ozobrome
Ozotype
Ozotype process

P

Palladiotype, 1914
Palladium processing
Pannotype
Paper negative
Paynetype
Photocollography
Photogram
Photogravure
Photolithography
Photosculpture
Phototype
Physautotype
Pinatype process
Platinotype, 1873
Playertype
Plumbeotype, developed by John Plumbe
Photo-crayotype

R
Rayograph

S

Salt print
Self-toning paper
Siderotype
Silver bromide
Silver chloride collodion
Simpsontype
Sphereotype
Stand development
Stanhope
Stannotype
Sun printing

T

Talbotype
Tintype or Ferrotype
Tithnotype
Transferotype

U

Uranium print

V

Van Dyke
Vesicular film

W

Wash-off Relief
Wet collodion plate
Wet collodion process
Wet plate process
Woodburytype
Wothlytype

Z
Ziatype

References 
 Alternative Photographic Process Mailing list archive

 
Lists of photography topics